The Voice Myanmar is the Burmese format of the most popular singing reality Television series called The Voice. It was broadcasting on MRTV-4 since 2018.

It is the sixth national franchise in the Southeast Asian region after Vietnam, Thailand, Indonesia, Philippines, and Cambodia.

Cast

Presenters
Key:
 Current presenter
 Previous presenter

Coaches

Key:
 Current coaches
 Previous coach(s)

Series overview
The host of the series is Tayzar Kyaw and judges for this series for season 1 are Kyar Pauk, Lynn Lynn, Yan Yan Chan and Ni Ni Khin Zaw. The Season-1 Winner is Ngwe Soe from Team Lynn Lynn.

The Voice Myanmar season 2 published from Feb to June 2019 in MRTV-4.The host is Tayzar Kyaw and judges are Kyar Pauk, Yan Yan Chan, Ni Ni Khin Zaw and the new one, R Zarni. The Final is broadcast in 9pm MMT 16, June. And the Season-2 Winner is Novem Htoo from Team Kyar Pauk.

The judges of The Voice Myanmar season 3 are Kyar Pauk, Yan Yan Chan, Ni Ni Khin Zaw and R Zarni.

Colour key
  Team Kyar Pauk
  Team Ni Ni Khin Zaw
  Team Yan Yan Chan
  Team Lynn Lynn
  Team R Zarni

Season summary
Season 1

Season 2

Season 3

References

External links
 

Singing competitions
Burmese television series
The Voice Myanmar